Delilah Williams Pierce  (March 3, 1904 – 1992) was an African American artist, curator and educator based in Washington, District of Columbia. Pierce is best known for abstract paintings depicting the natural world. Her work also includes portraiture, landscapes, and still lifes.

One of her works is in the permanent collections of the Smithsonian Museum of American Art.

A month before her death in 1992, she obtained an honorary degree from the University of the District of Columbia, Washington, DC (DHL). She supported local education.

Education 

 Dunbar High School, Washington, D.C. 
 1923 Teachers Certification, Miner Normal School, Washington, D.C. 
 1925 Domestic Art Education Diploma, Miner Normal School, Washington, D.C.
 1931 BS, Howard University, Washington, D.C. 
 1939 MA, Teachers College, Columbia University, New York, New York

Notable works
DC Waterfront, Maine Avenue, 1957, Smithsonian Museum of American Art, Washington, D.C.
Gayhead Cliffs, Martha's Vineyard, not dated, Howard University Art Gallery, Washington, D.C.

Further reading

References 

1904 births
1992 deaths
African-American women artists
Artists from Washington, D.C.
American women educators
20th-century African-American women
20th-century African-American people
20th-century American people
American women curators
American curators